Cormac O'Brien may refer to:
 Cormac O'Brien (author)
 Cormac O'Brien (hurler)